Xanthodisca is a genus of skippers in the family Hesperiidae.

Species
Xanthodisca ariel  (Mabille, 1878)
Xanthodisca rega  (Mabille, 1890)
Xanthodisca vibius  (Hewitson, 1878)

Former species
Xanthodisca astrape ((Holland, 1892) - transferred to Xanthonymus astrape ((Holland, 1892)

References

External links
Natural History Museum Lepidoptera genus database
 Seitz, A. Die Gross-Schmetterlinge der Erde 13: Die Afrikanischen Tagfalter. Plate XIII 79

Erionotini
Hesperiidae genera